Verkhny Chat (Ürge Sat) is a rural locality (a selo) in Mesyagutovsky Selsoviet, Yanaulsky District, Bashkortostan, Russia. The population was 127 as of 2010. There are 5 streets.

Geography 
Verkhny Chat is located 45 km southeast of Yanaul (the district's administrative centre) by road. Nizhny Chat is the nearest rural locality.

References 

Rural localities in Yanaulsky District